The Anthony Scoville House, also known as Corbu, is a historic house at 905 Dawley Road in Mount Holly, Vermont.  Built between 1964 and 1968, it is a distinctive local example of the International Style of architecture, designed by architect Anthony Scoville for his own year-round use.  The house was listed on the National Register of Historic Places in 2007.  In early 2016, it was for sale.

Description and history
The Scoville house stands on a rural  parcel of rolling terrain. The house is located on the west side of Dawley Road, a short way south of Shunpike Road, and is accessed via a long and winding drive that ends up approaching it from the south. The house is a square structure, with its second story overhanging the first on all four sides. The upper level's exterior is characterized by tall casement and plate glass windows and vertical flushboard siding that is either composite particleboard (as originally built) or plywood (which has been laid over deteriorating portions of the original particle board). The ground level has exposed rough concrete walls as well as similar finishes to the upper level.

The house was designed by architect Anthony Scoville, a recent graduate of Yale University, and was built between 1964 and 1968 by fellow Yale students and friends of Scoville's, on land he had purchased a few years earlier.  The house is based on the architectural ideals espoused by Le Corbusier, prompting Scoville to name the property "Corbu".  The house bears some conceptual resemblance to Le Corbusier's Villa Savoye in France.

See also
National Register of Historic Places listings in Rutland County, Vermont

References

Houses on the National Register of Historic Places in Vermont
National Register of Historic Places in Rutland County, Vermont
International style architecture in Vermont
Houses completed in 1968
Houses in Rutland County, Vermont
Buildings and structures in Mount Holly, Vermont